Uncharacterized protein C2orf27 is a protein that in humans is encoded by the C2orf27A gene. Although its function is not clearly understood, through the use of bioinformatic analysis more information is being brought to light.

Gene 

The mRNA is 1,222bp in length and is located at 2q21.2 with a total of five exons in Homo sapiens. Other sources list C2orf27B as a paralog but this is unlikely because both genes are located in the same place on chromosome 2. It seems to be generally accepted that they are the same gene. Other gene aliases include C2orf27 and chromosome 2 open reading frame 27A. The gene is surrounded upstream by POTEKP and downstream by ANKRD30BL.

Protein 

The length of the C2orf27 protein sequence is 203 a.a. in length and has a molecular weight of 21.5 kDa with a pI of 5.13 in Homo sapiens. When taking into account the primate orthologs, the molecular weights range from 21.4 to 36.7 kDa with the isoelectric point ranging from 4.58 to 5.25. This gene is located in the nucleus of the cell and, it doesn't contain any transmembrane regions. 

Looking at the motifs of the protein sequence, a few important ones are present. All of the repeat sequences are concentrated near the N-terminus of the protein and are highly conserved through all the orthologs. 

Post-translationally, there are multiple glycosylation sites scattered throughout the protein sequence, phosphorylation site positioned at S13, and a nuclear export signal located at L80 - V90, which also happens to be within a coiled coil region.

Expression
C2orf27 is ubiquitously expressed in most tissues but with increased expression in the brain, pancreas, kidneys, and testis.

Interactions
The protein is said to interaction with another protein called ataxin-1 which was discovered by performing a two hybrid prey pooling (Y2H) approach.
They share the similar characteristics of being located in the nucleus of cells and are expressed in the brain.

Structure

The overall structure of this protein is predicted to be composed of both alpha-helices and beta-sheets. The majority of the alpha-helices fall on the N-terminus of the protein and the beta-sheets fall near the C-terminus of the protein. There is a sequence of four prolines located from P185 to P188 has the secondary structure of a type II polyproline helix.

Evolutionary History 

This gene is found in primates but is also found at a very poor E-values in other mammals and organisms like fish, invertebrates, fungi, bacteria, or plants. The protein C2orf27, however, is strictly found only in primates like chimpanzees, gorillas, and baboons.

When comparing the mRNA of C2orf27A with the exclusion of primates, it is shown that there is a high similarity with a gene called neurobeachin (NBEA) NBEA. When taking a look at this connection between the two, it was found that NBEA was on a different reading frame than C2orf27A which already begins to rule out any similarity between the two. This was confirmed based upon the fact that when comparing both of these protein sequences, it resulted in a 44% similarity in a 1% query cover. These protein sequences are entirely different suggesting that their functions may not be similar. It was also discovered when comparing the alignment of the sequences, it was shown that a duplication event occurred between NBEA and C2orf27A. NBEA is present on chromosome 13 but a section of this mRNA corresponds, with a 96% similarity score, with exons one through four on C2orf27 of chromosome 2. This may be an example of a gene duplication event.

Taking all of this into account, the duplication of NBEA into chromosome 2 to form C2orf27 may be the divergence point of the gene becoming strictly present in primates only.

Clinical Significance
C2orf27A has been found to be associated with nonsyndromic craniosynostosis, a premature fusion of the calvaria. There are two distinct subtypes of this disease and patients with a certain subtype present with an increase in the expression of certain genes characteristic of each subtype. There is subtype A which is associated with increased insulin-like growth factor expression, and subtype B which is associated with increased integrin expression. There is an increased expression of the gene C2orf27A shown in patients with the subtype B disease.

Through a combination of a microarray assay and use of IPA software, C2orf27A has been found to be regulated by the hormone melatonin and linked with a role in cellular movement, the function and development of blood and bone marrow, and cell-mediated response of the immune system.

The chimeric fusion of C2orf27A (exon 1) and NBEA (exon 37 and 38) was present in only ovarian cancer samples.

References

Genes
Uncharacterized proteins